Prairie Township is a township in Davis County, Iowa, USA.  As of the 2000 census, its population was 394.

History
Prairie Township was organized in 1846.

Geography
Prairie Township covers an area of 27.63 square miles (71.57 square kilometers); of this, 0.06 square miles (0.15 square kilometers) or 0.21 percent is water.

Cities and towns
 Pulaski

Adjacent townships
 Union Township (north)
 Chequest Township, Van Buren County (northeast)
 Jackson Township, Van Buren County (east)
 Roscoe Township (south)
 Cleveland Township (west)
 Grove Township (west)
 Perry Township (northwest)

Cemeteries
The township contains seven cemeteries: Amish Mennonite Church, Armstrong, K P, Knights of Pythias Lodge, Pansy Hill, Pulaski and Wheaton.

References
 U.S. Board on Geographic Names (GNIS)
 United States Census Bureau cartographic boundary files

External links
 US-Counties.com
 City-Data.com

Townships in Davis County, Iowa
Townships in Iowa